Persija Jakarta U-20 is an Indonesian football club based in Jakarta. The club compete in EPA U-20.

2019 squad 
The following players are eligible for Liga 1 U-20 in the current 2019 Liga 1 U-20 season.

Former players
  Rizky Ramdani Lestaluhu (promotion to main teams in 2008)
  Hasyim Kipuw (promotion to main teams in 2009)
  Wirya Kumandra (promotion to main teams in 2010)
  Sansan Fauzi Husaeni (promotion to main teams in 2010)
  Rudi Setiawan (promotion to main teams in 2011)
  Delton Stevano (promotion to main teams in 2011)
  Fahreza Agamal (promotion to main teams in 2011)
  Abdul Tommy (promotion to main teams in 2011)
  Adixi Lenzivio (promotion to main teams in 2011)

Achievements & Honours
Indonesia Super League U-21
3rd place (group stage) (1) : 2009-2010
6th place (group stage) (1) : 2010-2011
5th place (second stage) (1) : 2011-2012
4th place (knockout stage) (1) : 2012-2013

References

Persija Jakarta
Football clubs in Indonesia